Rushi is a 2012 Indian Telugu-language medical drama film directed by Raj Madiraju and starring Arvind Krishna, Supriya Shelja, Master Gaurav and Ravi.

The film is produced by Prasad Productions, which was founded by L. V. Prasad. The film won the Nandi Award for Best Story Writer.

Plot

Cast 
Arvind Krishna as Rushi
Supriya Shelja as Pooja 
Master Gaurav as Karthik
Ravi as Venkat
Sanjay Raichura as medical professor

Soundtrack 
The music was composed by Snigha and the duo Don-Chandran. The lyrics were written by Krishna Chinni. The audio was released through Aditya Music.

Reception 
A critic from The Times of India wrote that "the director deserves a pat on the back for attempting a novel subject, and a socially relevant theme even if he only managed to partially pull it off". A critic from Rediff.com said that "Rushi has a meaningful theme. The film should be appreciated for tackling a different subject and a significant theme". A critic from 123telugu opined that "Rushi is a very different movie when compared to the regular formula movies that come out of industry. It is an honest and mature portrayal of a young doctor’s crusade against the system for the sake of his patient".

References